is a former Japanese football player who last featured for YSCC Yokohama.

Club statistics
Updated to 23 February 2019.

References

External links

Profile at YSCC Yokohama

1988 births
Living people
Toin University of Yokohama alumni
Association football people from Kanagawa Prefecture
Japanese footballers
J3 League players
Japan Football League players
YSCC Yokohama players
Association football midfielders